The 2021 ToyotaCare 250 was the 6th stock car race of the 2021 NASCAR Camping World Truck Series, and the 13th iteration of the event. The race was held on Saturday, April 17, 2021 in Richmond, Virginia at Richmond Raceway, a  permanent D-shaped oval. The race took 250 laps to complete. John Hunter Nemechek of Kyle Busch Motorsports would win the race, his 8th overall career win and his 2nd of the season. Kyle Busch of Kyle Busch Motorsports and Tyler Ankrum of GMS Racing would score the rest of the podium positions, finishing 2nd and 3rd, respectively.

Two drivers would debut in the Truck Series for this race: Howie DiSavino III and Keith McGee. After two years from being absent from NASCAR, Ryan Reed would return to NASCAR after he was signed to drive the #49 CMI Motorsports truck, to help lock the team in races based on owner's points.

Background

Starting lineup 
Qualifying was determined by a formula based on the previous race, the 2021 Pinty's Truck Race on Dirt. As a result, Ben Rhodes of ThorSport Racing would win the pole.

Trey Hutchens would be the only driver not to qualify.

Race

Pre-race ceremonies

Race recap

Post-race driver comments

Race results 
Stage 1 Laps: 70

Stage 2 Laps: 70

Stage 3 Laps: 110

References 

ToyotaCare 250
NASCAR races at Richmond Raceway
ToyotaCare 250
ToyotaCare 250